The 1994 Patriot League men's basketball tournament was played at Alumni Hall in Annapolis, Maryland after the conclusion of the 1993–94 regular season. Top seed  defeated #3 seed , 78–76 in the championship game, to win its first Patriot League Tournament title. The Midshipmen earned an automatic bid to the 1994 NCAA tournament as #16 seed in the West region.

Format
All eight league members participated in the tournament, with teams seeded according to regular season conference record. Play began with the quarterfinal round.

Bracket

* denotes overtime period

References

Tournament
Patriot League men's basketball tournament
Patriot League men's basketball tournament
Patriot League men's basketball tournament